Long Clough is a Grade II listed privately owned historic house in Littleborough, Greater Manchester.

History 
The have been various families resident at Long Clough since the seventeenth century. One example is the Stansfield family of Long Clough who lived there from at least 1697 until the 1860s: from John Stansfield (d.1721) to James Stansfield (1785–1861). It has now become Long Clough Care Home providing nursing and personal care.

Architecture 
This farmhouse preserves a door lintel of 1725 (though a house certainly existed earlier than this date), and it also has mullion windows, and coped gables with kneelers and gable and ridge chimney stacks.

See also
Listed buildings in Littleborough, Greater Manchester

References 

Listed buildings in Greater Manchester
Buildings and structures in the Metropolitan Borough of Rochdale
Buildings and structures in Rochdale
Grade II listed houses